John Stokes (March 20, 1756 – October 12, 1790) was a United States district judge of the United States District Court for the District of North Carolina.

Education and career

Born on March 20, 1756, in the Colony of Virginia, British America, Stokes served as a captain in the Continental Army during the American Revolutionary War, from 1778 to 1783. He was a state's attorney for Rowan County, North Carolina in 1784. He was a teacher of law in Rowan County from 1784 to 1785. He was a member of the North Carolina Senate from Montgomery County from 1786 to 1787. He was in private practice in Rowan County starting in 1787. He was a member of the North Carolina House of Commons (now the North Carolina House of Representatives) in 1789. He was a member of the North Carolina convention to ratify the United States Constitution in 1789, which was ultimately ratified by a subsequent convention in 1790.

Federal judicial service

He was confirmed by the United States Senate on August 3, 1790, and received his commission the same day. His service terminated on October 12, 1790, due to his death.

Honor

Stokes County, North Carolina is named for Stokes.

References

Sources
 

1756 births
1790 deaths
Continental Army officers from North Carolina
North Carolina state senators
Members of the North Carolina House of Representatives
Judges of the United States District Court for the District of North Carolina
United States federal judges appointed by George Washington
18th-century American judges
18th-century American politicians